Çetenli may refer to:
 Çetenli, Doğubayazıt, Agri Province, Turkey
 Çetenli, Altınözü, Hatay Province, Turkey